While I Live is a 1947 British drama film directed and co-written by John Harlow and starring Sonia Dresdel, Tom Walls and Carol Raye. While I Live is best remembered for its musical theme "The Dream of Olwen" composed by Charles Williams, reprised at intervals throughout the film, which became hugely popular in its time and is still regularly performed.  The film itself became widely known as The Dream of Olwen. It was based on a play by Robert Bell, in which Sonia Dresdel also starred.

Plot
In Cornwall in 1922, young pianist and composer Olwen Trevelyan (Audrey Fildes) is struggling with the ending of a piano tone poem she is composing.  Driven to complete the piece by her domineering elder sister Julia (Sonia Dresdel), Olwen becomes agitated and despondent, and one night sleepwalks to the edge of a cliff near their home.  Julia follows her and shouts her name but Olwen, abruptly awakened, loses her balance and falls to her death on the rocks below.  Julia is unable to come to terms with Olwen's death and the guilt of her own role in it, over the years becoming a reclusive, obsessive figure whose main raison d'être is to keep Olwen's memory alive.  Olwen's final composition gains her posthumous recognition, and each year on the anniversary of her death it is broadcast on the radio.

On the 25th anniversary of Olwen's death, Julia is listening to the broadcast when she hears a frantic knocking at the door and opens it to admit an unknown young woman (Carol Raye), who immediately walks up to the piano and begins expertly playing along with the piece on the radio.  The young woman claims to have lost her memory and to have no idea of who she is or how she came to chance upon the isolated house, yet she seems to have a familiarity with the surroundings and the history of the Trevelyan family.  Struck by her physical resemblance to Olwen, Julia offers her refuge and, also seeing behavioural traits reminiscent of Olwen, becomes convinced that the woman is the reincarnation of her dead sister.  A local faith healer, Nehemiah (Tom Walls), who also claims second sight, becomes involved and it seems increasingly as though history is repeating itself, culminating when the young woman too is found standing precariously on the edge of the cliff from which Olwen fell.

Cast
 Sonia Dresdel as Julia Trevelyan
 Tom Walls as Nehemiah
 Carol Raye as Sally Grant
 Patricia Burke as Christine Sloan
 Clifford Evans as Peter Sloan
 John Warwick as George Grant
 Audrey Fildes as Olwen Trevelyan
 Charles Victor as Sgt. Pearne
 Edward Lexy as Selby
 Ernest Butcher as Ambrose
 Enid Hewit as Ruth
 Sally Rogers as Hannah

References

External links 
 While I Live at the British Film Institute
 
 

1947 films
1947 drama films
British drama films
British black-and-white films
Films set in Cornwall
Films directed by John Harlow
Compositions by Charles Williams
Films set in 1922
Films set in 1947
Films shot at MGM-British Studios
1940s English-language films
1940s British films
Films about faith healing